In mathematics, especially group theory, two elements  and  of a group are conjugate if there is an element  in the group such that  This is an equivalence relation whose equivalence classes are called conjugacy classes.  In other words, each conjugacy class is closed under  for all elements  in the group.

Members of the same conjugacy class cannot be distinguished by using only the group structure, and therefore share many properties. The study of conjugacy classes of non-abelian groups is fundamental for the study of their structure. For an abelian group, each conjugacy class is a set containing one element (singleton set).

Functions that are constant for members of the same conjugacy class are called class functions.

Definition

Let  be a group.

In the case of the general linear group  of invertible matrices, the conjugacy relation is called  matrix similarity.

It can be easily shown that conjugacy is an equivalence relation and therefore partitions  into equivalence classes. The equivalence class that contains the element  is

All elements belonging to the same conjugacy class have the same order.

Conjugacy classes may be referred to by describing them, or more briefly by abbreviations such as "6A", meaning "a certain conjugacy class with elements of order 6", and "6B" would be a different conjugacy class with elements of order 6; the conjugacy class 1A is the conjugacy class of the identity which has order 1. In some cases, conjugacy classes can be described in a uniform way; for example, in the symmetric group they can be described by cycle type.

Examples
The symmetric group  consisting of the 6 permutations of three elements, has three conjugacy classes:

 No change .  The single member has order 1.
 Transposing two .  The 3 members all have order 2.
 A cyclic permutation of all three .  The 2 members both have order 3.

These three classes also correspond to the classification of the isometries of an equilateral triangle.

The symmetric group  consisting of the 24 permutations of four elements, has five conjugacy classes, listed with their description, cycle type, member order, and members:

 No change.  Cycle type = [14].  Order = 1.  Members = { (1, 2, 3, 4) }.  The single row containing this conjugacy class is shown as a row of black circles in the adjacent table. 
 Interchanging two (other two remain unchanged).  Cycle type = [1221].  Order = 2.  Members = { (1, 2, 4, 3), (1, 4, 3, 2), (1, 3, 2, 4), (4, 2, 3, 1), (3, 2, 1, 4), (2, 1, 3, 4) }).  The 6 rows containing this conjugacy class are highlighted in green in the adjacent table.
 A cyclic permutation of three (other one remains unchanged).  Cycle type = [1131].  Order = 3.  Members = { (1, 3, 4, 2), (1, 4, 2, 3), (3, 2, 4, 1), (4, 2, 1, 3), (4, 1, 3, 2), (2, 4, 3, 1), (3, 1, 2, 4), (2, 3, 1, 4) }).  The 8 rows containing this conjugacy class are shown with normal print (no boldface or color highlighting) in the adjacent table.
 A cyclic permutation of all four.  Cycle type = [41].  Order = 4.  Members = { (2, 3, 4, 1), (2, 4, 1, 3), (3, 1, 4, 2), (3, 4, 2, 1), (4, 1, 2, 3), (4, 3, 1, 2) }).  The 6 rows containing this conjugacy class are highlighted in orange in the adjacent table.
 Interchanging two, and also the other two.  Cycle type = [22].  Order = 2.  Members = { (2, 1, 4, 3), (4, 3, 2, 1), (3, 4, 1, 2) }).  The 3 rows containing this conjugacy class are shown with boldface entries in the adjacent table.

The proper rotations of the cube, which can be characterized by permutations of the body diagonals, are also described by conjugation in 

In general, the number of conjugacy classes in the symmetric group  is equal to the number of integer partitions of   This is because each conjugacy class corresponds to exactly one partition of  into cycles, up to permutation of the elements of 

In general, the Euclidean group can be studied by conjugation of isometries in Euclidean space.

Properties

 The identity element is always the only element in its class, that is 
 If  is abelian then  for all , i.e.  for all  (and the converse is also true: if all conjugacy classes are singletons then  is abelian).
 If two elements  belong to the same conjugacy class (that is, if they are conjugate), then they have the same order. More generally, every statement about  can be translated into a statement about  because the map  is an automorphism of  called an inner automorphism. See the next property for an example.
For example, in the symmetric group, the square of an element of type (3)(2) (a 3-cycle and a 2-cycle) is an element of type (3), therefore one of the power-up classes of (3) is the class (3)(2) (where  is a power-up class of ).
 An element  lies in the center  of  if and only if its conjugacy class has only one element,  itself.
Alternatively, there are  ways to fix a point of a permutation of size .

Conjugacy as group action

For any two elements  let

or on the set of the subgroups of

Conjugacy class equation

That can also be seen from the orbit-stabilizer theorem, when considering the group as acting on itself through conjugation, so that orbits are conjugacy classes and stabilizer subgroups are centralizers. The converse holds as well.

Furthermore, if we choose a single representative element  from every conjugacy class, we infer from the disjointness of the conjugacy classes that 
 
where  is the centralizer of the element  Observing that each element of the center  forms a conjugacy class containing just itself gives rise to the class equation:

where the sum is over a representative element from each conjugacy class that is not in the center.

Knowledge of the divisors of the group order  can often be used to gain information about the order of the center or of the conjugacy classes.

Example

Consider a finite -group  (that is, a group with order  where  is a prime number and ). We are going to prove that .

Since the order of any conjugacy class of  must divide the order of  it follows that each conjugacy class  that is not in the center also has order some power of  where  But then the class equation requires that  From this we see that  must divide  so 

Hence  is abelian and in fact isomorphic to the direct product of two cyclic groups each of order

Conjugacy of subgroups and general subsets

More generally, given any subset  ( not necessarily a subgroup), define a subset  to be conjugate to  if there exists some  such that  Let  be the set of all subsets  such that  is conjugate to 

This follows since, if  then  if and only if  in other words, if and only if  are in the same coset of 

By using  this formula generalizes the one given earlier for the number of elements in a conjugacy class. 

The above is particularly useful when talking about subgroups of  The subgroups can thus be divided into conjugacy classes, with two subgroups belonging to the same class if and only if they are conjugate.
Conjugate subgroups are isomorphic, but isomorphic subgroups need not be conjugate. For example, an abelian group may have two different subgroups which are isomorphic, but they are never conjugate.

Geometric interpretation

Conjugacy classes in the fundamental group of a path-connected topological space can be thought of as equivalence classes of free loops under free homotopy.

Conjugacy class and irreducible representations in finite group

In any finite group, the number of distinct (non-isomorphic) irreducible representations over the complex numbers is precisely the number of conjugacy classes.

See also

Notes

References

External links
 

Group theory